Eugenio Duca (27 February 1950 – 5 October 2021) was an Italian politician.

Biography
During the 1970s, Duca was active in a railway workers' union and served on the Permanent Maritime Commission of the Camera di Commercio, Industria, Agricoltura e Artigianato from 1978 to 1983. He served as a city councilor in Ancona from 1983 to 1997. He was elected to represent Marche in the Chamber of Deputies in 1994 and joined the coalition Alliance of Progressives. He was re-elected in 1996 and 2001 as part of the coalition The Olive Tree. He served as national leader of the Democrats of the Left in the maritime economic sector until 2007.

In , Duca ran for mayor of Ancona, but earned only 5.9% of the vote.

Eugenio Duca died of a heart attack in Ancona on 5 October 2021, at the age of 71.

References

1950 births
2021 deaths
People from Ancona
Italian politicians
Deputies of Legislature XII of Italy
Deputies of Legislature XIII of Italy
Deputies of Legislature XIV of Italy
Democratic Party of the Left politicians
Democrats of the Left politicians